Citizens for Mecklenburg-Western Pomerania (BMV) was a regionalist political party in Germany based in Mecklenburg-Western Pomerania. They were founded from a split in the faction of the Alternative for Germany (AfD) party in the state parliament. They had described themselves as a "conservative &  regional party" and had compared themselves to the Christian Social Union (CSU) in Bavaria. They had 4 seats in the regional parliament before merging into the Free Voters.

References

Conservative parties in Germany
Defunct regional parties in Germany
Political parties disestablished in 2018
Political parties established in 2018
Politics of Mecklenburg-Western Pomerania
Regional parties in Germany
Alternative for Germany breakaway groups